Pierre Goubert (25 January 1915 – 16 January 2012) was a French historian. A member of the Annales School, he is considered one of the founders of historical demography and modern rural history. He was a noted specialist on the 17th century, especially of the Ancien Régime societies and mentalities.

Works
Beauvais et le Beauvaisis de 1600 à 1730 : contribution à l'histoire sociale de la France du XVIIe siècle (1958)
Familles marchandes sous l'ancien régime : les Danse et les Motte, de Beauvais (1959)
1789, les Francais ont la parole : cahiers de doleances des Etats generaux (1964) with Michel Denis
Louis XIV et vingt millions de Français (1966) in English Louis XIV and twenty million Frenchmen (1970)
Cent mille provinciaux au XVIIe siècle (1968)
Louis XIV: le roi, le royaume: dossier (1968)
L'ancien régime 1. La société (1969) in English The ancien régime. French society, 1600-1750 (1973)
L'avènement du Roi-Soleil (1971)
L'ancien régime 2: Les pouvoirs (1973)
Clio parmi les hommes (1976)
La vie quotidienne des paysans français au XVIIe siècle (1982) in English The French peasantry in the seventeenth century (1986)
Initiation à l'histoire de la France (1984) in English The course of French history (1988)
Les Français et l'Ancien Régime. I - La Société et l'État (1984)
Mazarin (1990)
Un parcours d'historien : souvenirs, 1915-1995 (1996)
Le siècle de Louis XIV: études (1996)

Further reading
 Fauve-Chamoux, Antoinette. "Pierre Goubert (1915-2012). A take-off from Beauvais to Global History." Romanian Journal of Population Studies 7.1 (2013): 75+.
 Fauve-Chamoux, Antoinette. "A Personal Account of the History of Historical Demography in Europe at the End of the Glorious Thirty (1967-1975)." Essays in Economic & Business History 35.1 (2017): 175-205.
La France d'Ancien Régime : études réunies en l'honneur de Pierre Goubert (1984)
2010 biography on Pierre Goubert

References

External links
 http://www.lexpress.fr/informations/goubert-maitre-et-eleve_612750.html

1915 births
2012 deaths
People from Saumur
20th-century French historians
French military personnel of World War II
French male non-fiction writers